Abeille des Aydes Blois Basket 41, commonly known as ADA Blois, is a professional basketball based in Blois, France. The club plays in the Pro A, which is the top tier of basketball in the country.

History 

Created in 1907 under the name Abeille des Aydes, the club would first allow the practice of gymnastics and shooting. It is after the war that one begins to practice basketball there.

Between 1986 and 1995, ADA Basket, coached by Jean-Raoul Baudry, climbed from Regional 2 to National 2 with four consecutive accessions from 1987 to 1991. But at the end of the 1994–1995 season, the club filed for bankruptcy. and is downgraded at Regional 1. In 2001, the first team managed to find the National 2 where she played in 1994–1995.

On 10 September 2005. ADA Blois Basket was played its first match in National 1. At the end of this season, the team will be relegated to National 2 but will go up the following year in National 1. After failing in the final of the playoffs on several occasions in 2012, 2013 and 2015, ADA Blois wins the French National 1 Championship in 2016 and thus reaches the Pro B for the first time in its history.

On 29 March 2016. ADA Blois Basket won her home game against La Rochelle (75–50) and became French Champion of NM1 at 5 days before the end of the 2015–2016 season of National 1. The ADA would play in the Pro B for the first time in its history. 

In 2017–18 season, Blois surprised by finishing the season first in the regular season with a 27–7 record in the Pro B. Thereby, Blois was crowned the Pro B champions and promoted to the top-tier Pro A. ADA power forward Tyren Johnson was named the Pro B Most Valuable Player. However, due to insufficient infrastructures, the club stayed in the second-tier division.

In 2022, Blois won the promotion play-offs to access the top-tier division for the first time in their history.

Honours 
Pro B
Winners : 2017–18
Nationale Masculine 1
Winners (1): 2015–16
Nationale Masculine 2
Winners (1): 2004–05

Season by season

Players

Current roster

Individual awards 
Pro B Most Valuable Player
Tyren Johnson – 2018

Notable players

References

External links 
 

1907 establishments in France
Basketball teams established in 1907
Basketball teams in France